Cosme Pacheco ( – ), was a Peruvian lieutenant-colonel during the Peruvian War of Independence and revolutionary wars in Perú. He was assigned to the cavalry of the Army of Peru in the Regiments of Hussars of Junín Province and the Lancers of Cusco. He participated in the military campaigns for the independence of Peru from 1821 to 1825. He was awarded the medals of the Battle of Junin and the Battle of Ayacucho. Later, he fought in military campaigns of the south of Peru and the Upper Peru, as well as in the Peruvian-Bolivian conflict, between 1825 and 1828. Retired from active military service, he was recalled to service in 1835 by the request of the Supreme Provisory Board of Government of the Republic of Peru. He actively participated in revolutions and civil wars in his country, collaborating with the highest authorities as emissary and peacemaker in the central highlands of Peru. He died in the region of his birth, Department of Cusco, of unknown causes, presumably around 1851.

Biography 

No records to document Pacheco's dates of birth and death are known to exist. He is believed to have been born in Quiquijana, Cusco region around 1803 - 1804. There is an inscription on the only known portrait of Pacheco, painted by Jose Gil de Castro stating the date - September 27, 1831 - and describing Pacheco as 28 years of age at that date. He spent most of his life and died in Cusco.

As per one transcription of his service record of 1924 (in Spanish), he joined the Liberating Army of the Andes as a second-lieutenant, on January 2, 1821. He was initially deployed to the Abtao Squad for little more than 2 months and then as an escort of the Prefect of the City of Lima, General José de la Riva Agüero for 1 year and 7 months. On November 1, 1821 he was promoted to the rank of Lieutenant and incorporated into the First Squad of the Regiment of Hussars of Peru, renamed Hussars of Junín after the heroic Battle of Junin. In the same squad, he coincided with its commander, Lieutenant Colonel Manuel Isidoro Suarez; Jose Razuri, who was the Assistant Major; and the then Captain Domingo Nieto, who were among the officers.

In the Battle of Junin, it is the First Squad that triggers the reversal of an imminent defeat. Initially overwhelming the patriots, the royalists, led by General Jose de Canterac himself, charged the cavalry of the Liberating Army of the Andes unprepared and misplaced in the battlefield, crushing the squads of Grenadiers and the Hossars of Colombia, wounding and capturing Manuel Necochea, General in command of the whole patriot cavalry force. The Spanish began to celebrate what seemed their inevitable victory. The First Squad of Hussars of Peru have not yet entered into battle due to its position in the battlefield, next to a ravine they had crossed, waiting for orders behind a hill and unnoticed by the royalists. At the order of Lieutenant Colonel Suarez, Lieutenant Pacheco, along with the whole squad, charged the exposed rear of the Spanish Cavalry as they were clashing with the disorderly patriot's cavalry. The assault of the First Squad was due to a false order of attack against the royalists, purportedly given by General Jose de La Mar and communicated by Major Razuri to Lieutenant Colonel Suarez. The charge of First Squad of the Hussars of Peru took the Spanish, fully dispersed, completely by surprise, resulting in confusion by the royalists, trapped now in between patriot cavalry squads. The attack also prompted the return to the melee of the bulk of the patriot's cavalry, under the command of General Guillermo Miller, causing a crushing defeat of the royalists in the battlefield of Junin. Bolivar's recognition to the courage of the Hussars of Peru was its renaming to Hussars of Junin,

On December 3, 1824, six days before the Battle of Ayacucho, Cosme Pacheco was promoted to the rank of Captain. The First Squad of the renamed Hussars of Junin participated in the patriot's victory against the Spanish forces commanded by Viceroy Jose de la Serna, who after the battle where he was gravely wounded, capitulated the Spanish sovereignty in Peru, allowing his return to Spain. Despite the heroic participation of many pro-independence Peruvians in both battles, which ended the Spanish domain in Peru and in South America, there was no immediate recognition. It was not until September 18, 1829 that the Government of Peru, headed by Agustín Gamarra, issues a decree recognizing Pacheco's contribution to the cause of independence, along with all Peruvians who fought at the Battle of Junín.

Cosme Pacheco request his discharge from the Hussars of Junin the 10 of September 1825. He went to be part of the Fourth Company of the Lancers Squad of Cusco, becoming its Captain on December 17, 1828. On August 8, 1831, is promoted to the rank of Sergeant Major of Cavalry. His service record reports 11 years, 4 months and 4 days until May 12, 1832. During the Peruvian Civil War of 1834 served in the side of President Luis Jose de Orbegoso, under the orders of General Guillermo Miller. In such confrontation, he had a distinguished participation in the Battle of Huaylacucho in the Province of Huancavelica, on April 17, 1834. In the battle, Sergeant Major Pacheco was in command of a detachment of 12 lancers. By direct order of General Miller, he was in charge of protecting the troops and preventing ammunition from falling into the hands of the enemy, commanded by General Jose Rufino Echenique. This is registered in the reports of General Francisco de Paula Otero.

Subsequently collaborated with General Domingo Nieto in his work as a peacemaker during the political-military riots that occurred in Peru between 1830 and 1850. In the opinion, from their campaigns In the Hussars of Junin, Cosme Pacheco, as Lieutenant, would have formed a friendly relationship with the then Captain Nieto, under whose orders he had served, according to the chain of command. Counting then with his full confidence, at the beginning of 1834 he was emissary for the then General Domingo Nieto before the Provisional President of Peru, Luis Jose de Orbegoso, to agree on Nieto's defense plans for the Province of Ayacucho, then caught in military uprisings like the rest of the country. In the letter that General Nieto addresses to President Luis José de Orbegoso, he expresses the disposition of the Commander Pacheco on the pacifying cause.

He was reinstated to service as Lieutenant Colonel, effective as of July 15, 1835. The reinstatement is given at the request of the Supreme Provisional Government Board of the Republic of Peru, chaired by Luis José de Orbegoso himself.

His collaboration and friendship with General Nieto lasted for more than a decade, always from his base in the provinces of the central highlands of Peru. There is correspondence that General Nieto addressed to him personally, where issues of pacification of that part of the country are discussed in times of political and military instability. A letter, dated November 1844, offers some information on the work he was doing then, apparently in permanent retirement from the military. From what the transcriber of the letter states, it would be incomplete and there is only what appears to be the last page of the letter.

For an indeterminate period of time, probably from the time of the last correspondence with Domingo Nieto and prior to his death, Cosme Pacheco served as Sub-Prefect of the Province of Cotabambas in what is now the Department of Apurímac in the central highlands of Peru. He died on an unknown date, presumably around 1851. The latter can be inferred by the legislative decree acknowledging the license of previous marriage, issued by the Congress of the Republic of Peru on October 3, 1851, in favour of his widow, Manuela Arrambide, to be benefited with a survivor's pension. Cosme Pacheco was buried with military honors in the General Cemetery of Almudena in Cusco.

At the beginning of 1953, there were initiatives to recognize his participation in both the Peruvian War of Independence and the initiation of the Republic of Peru. On January 2, the Senate debated the proposal by the Municipality of Cusco, requesting the Peruvian Ministry of War to relocate Cosme Pacheco's remains to the Pantheon of the Heroes in Lima. On January 22 of the same year, a request by Dr. Francisco Tamayo, Senator for the Department of Cusco, was debated. The initiative sought to recognize Cosme Pacheco as a Hero of the Independence of Peru.

Campaigns and Battles 

 Campaign of Ica in  1822 with General Domingo Tristán.
 Battle of Mamacona, April 7, 1822 .
 Intermediate Campaign in 1823 with General Guillermo Miller.
 Campaign of the South in 1823 with General Antonio José de Sucre.
 Surprise of Azapa in Arica on June 16, 1823.
 Campaigns of the United Liberation Army of Peru in 1824, also with General Antonio José de Sucre.
 Battle of Junin, on August 6, 1824.
 Battle of Ayacucho, December 9, 1824.
 Campaign of Upper Peru in 1825 under superior orders.
 Campaign of Bolivia in 1828 with General Agustín Gamarra.
 Battle of Huaylacucho in Huancavelica, on April 17, 1834.

Distinctions 

 Medal of Junin.
 Medal of Ayacucho.
 Recognition of sacrifice and courage, Agustín Gamarra, Provisional President of Peru.

See also 

 Independence of Peru
 Battle of Junin
 Battle of Ayacucho

References 

Peruvian War of Independence
Cusco
Peruvian military leaders
Year of birth uncertain
Year of death unknown